German submarine U-565 was a Type VIIC U-boat built for Nazi Germany's Kriegsmarine for service during World War II.
She was laid down on 30 March 1940 by Blohm & Voss in Hamburg as yard number 541, launched on 20 February 1941 and commissioned on 10 April 1941 under Oberleutnant Johann Jebsen.

Design
German Type VIIC submarines were preceded by the shorter Type VIIB submarines. U-565 had a displacement of  when at the surface and  while submerged. She had two shafts and two  propellers.

U-565 was fitted with five  torpedo tubes (four fitted at the bow and one at the stern), fourteen torpedoes, one  SK C/35 naval gun, 220 rounds, and a  C/30 anti-aircraft gun. The boat had a complement of between forty-four and sixty.

Service history
The boat's service began on 10 April 1941 with training as part of the 1st U-boat Flotilla. She was transferred to the 29th flotilla on 1 January 1942 in the Mediterranean where she remained until being scuttled in 1944.

Wolfpacks
She took part in two wolfpacks, namely:
Arnauld (5 – 18 November 1941)
Wal (10 – 12 November 1942)

Fate
U-565 was badly damaged by bombs dropped by US aircraft on 19 and 24 September 1944 in the Mediterranean near Skaramanga in Greece.  She was scuttled on 30 September 1944 at Skaramanga Bay.

Summary of raiding history

See also
 Mediterranean U-boat Campaign (World War II)

References

Notes

Citations

Bibliography

External links

German Type VIIC submarines
1941 ships
U-boats commissioned in 1941
U-boats sunk by depth charges
U-boats sunk in 1944
World War II submarines of Germany
World War II shipwrecks in the Mediterranean Sea
Ships built in Hamburg
Maritime incidents in September 1944
Shipwrecks of Greece